Robert Findley (born August 4, 1985) is an American former professional soccer player who played as a forward. He was capped 11 times by the United States national team, having made his international debut in 2007.

Findley played college soccer for the Oregon State Beavers and amateur soccer for the Boulder Rapids Reserve before turning professional in 2007. He played in Major League Soccer for Los Angeles Galaxy and Real Salt Lake, before moving to English club Nottingham Forest in January 2011. After a loan at Gillingham, Findley returned to Real Salt Lake before spells with Toronto FC and Rayo OKC.

Early and personal life
Born in Phoenix, Arizona, Findley attended Shadow Mountain High School, graduating in 2003. Findley is a cousin of basketball players Mike Bibby and Eddie House, and American football wide receiver Shaun McDonald. He is of Trinidadian descent.

Club career

College and amateur
Findley began his career playing college soccer at Oregon State University. Later, he spent two seasons with the Boulder Rapids Reserve of the USL Premier Development League.

Major League Soccer
Findley was selected by the Los Angeles Galaxy in the second round of the 2007 MLS SuperDraft as the sixteenth pick overall.

On June 21, 2007, Findley was traded along with midfielder Nathan Sturgis to Real Salt Lake in exchange for veteran forward Chris Klein. He joined Danish Superliga side Brøndby on trial in January 2009. However, he failed to secure a contract with the club and returned to Salt Lake. In the following season, he had three multi-goal matches, including the first hat trick in franchise history.

In the 2009 MLS Cup Final, Findley scored in the 64th minute, tying the match at 1–1; Salt Lake later emerged victorious in penalty kicks, claiming the MLS Cup in one of the biggest upsets in the history of the MLS Cup final.

Findley's contract with Real Salt Lake expired at the end of the 2010 MLS season, and he announced his intentions to leave MLS and move to Europe.  Despite this statement of intent, Findley was selected by Portland Timbers in the 2010 MLS Expansion Draft, enabling Portland to retain his MLS rights should he ever choose to return to the league.

Nottingham Forest
After a short trial with English club Wolverhampton Wanderers in mid-December 2010, Findley was signed as a free agent by English Championship club Nottingham Forest on December 23, 2010, subject to receiving a work permit. His work permit was approved at a F.A. hearing in London on January 15, 2011. Findley incurred a thigh injury in training shortly after joining Forest and became unavailable until Spring 2011. After several months on the sidelines, Findley finally made his debut for Forest on April 22, 2011, coming on as a substitute in a 3–2 victory over East Midlands rivals Leicester City.

Findley made his full competitive debut for Forest on August 8, 2011, in a home fixture against Notts County in the first round of the 2011–12 Football League Cup. Findley scored Forest's second goal—his first goal for the club—after having an earlier effort ruled out for offside. He also converted his penalty in the match's penalty shoot-out, which Forest won. Forest manager Steve McClaren said: "He can have a big impact in the Championship. He is as fast as lightning. He is quick, he covers a lot of ground, he works for the team, he defends when he has to and, most importantly, he can get a goal". After struggling for first-team opportunities in 2012, Findley was loaned to League Two club Gillingham on September 21, 2012, for an initial period of one month. He made his debut for Gillingham in a 2–0 away win at Port Vale, and supplied the cross for the first goal. Vale manager Micky Adams stated that "the pace of Findley scared the life out of" his team. After seven appearances for the Gills, Findley returned to Forest.

On January 14, 2013, Nottingham Forest announced that Findley's contract had been terminated by mutual consent.

Return to Major League Soccer
Following his release from Forest, Real Salt Lake acquired Findley's MLS rights from Portland in exchange for allocation money and re-signed him on January 16, 2013.

On December 1, 2014, it was announced that Salt Lake had declined their option on Findley's contract. Findley entered the 2014 MLS Re-Entry Draft on December 12, 2014 and was chosen in the first round of stage one by Toronto FC. He scored a goal in his first game for Toronto to start the 2015 season. Findley would go on to finish the season scoring 2 goals for Toronto FC.

On February 10, 2016, it was reported that Findley was no longer with Toronto FC.

NASL

On February 24, 2016, Findley signed a contract with Rayo OKC of the NASL, the second tier in the American soccer pyramid. On April 22, 2016, Findley scored his first goal for Rayo OKC in a 3-2 victory over Miami FC.

On March 6, 2018, Findley announced his retirement from professional soccer.

International career
Findley made his international debut for the United States national team in October 2007 and made three appearances at the 2010 World Cup in South Africa, starting at forward for the US against England and Slovenia in the group stage of the tournament, as well as starting in the round of 16 match against Ghana.

Career statistics

References

1985 births
Living people
African-American soccer players
American soccer players
American expatriate soccer players
American expatriate sportspeople in England
Association football forwards
Oregon State Beavers men's soccer players
Colorado Rapids U-23 players
LA Galaxy players
Real Salt Lake players
Nottingham Forest F.C. players
Gillingham F.C. players
Toronto FC players
Rayo OKC players
American sportspeople of Trinidad and Tobago descent
United States men's under-23 international soccer players
United States men's international soccer players
2010 FIFA World Cup players
LA Galaxy draft picks
USL League Two players
Major League Soccer players
English Football League players
North American Soccer League players
Soccer players from Arizona
Expatriate footballers in England
21st-century African-American sportspeople